Two ships of the United States Navy have been named USS Spruance, in honor of Admiral Raymond A. Spruance (1886–1969):

  was the lead ship of s, launched in 1973 and struck in 2005

See also
 Spruance (disambiguation)

United States Navy ship names